LaChina Robinson is a basketball analyst who calls college basketball games for ESPN, Fox Sports 1, and FS South. She is also the analyst for the Atlanta Dream of the WNBA and calls select WNBA games for ESPN and NBATV.

Early life

After a flirtation with cheerleading, Robinson decided to try out basketball. A size of 6'4" certainly would help her cause, but experience would be needed.

Robinson became an AAU member in high school. Her experience earned her a scholarship to Wake Forest University where she would play for four seasons. Over her four-year career Robinson played in 112 games, 95 of which she started. Robinson went on to rank third in school history with blocks (77) and 15th in rebounds (475).

Broadcasting

After playing her four years of college, Robinson joined the ACC administration offices for one full season before heading to Georgia Tech where she served as a special assistant to the head coach, director of operations and administrative assistant in charge of recruiting. Georgia Tech then hired her as an analyst on their radio broadcasts.

In 2009 Robinson was hired by ESPN.

2010 would be Robinson's first full season of serving as an analyst for ESPN and Fox Sports South. Robinson was awarded the 2021 Mel Greenberg Media Award by the Women's Basketball Coaches Association.

References 

College basketball announcers in the United States
Living people
Women's college basketball announcers in the United States
American radio sports announcers
Women sports announcers
Women's National Basketball Association media
Women's National Basketball Association announcers
Year of birth missing (living people)